The Tabar Group is an island group in Papua New Guinea, located  north of New Ireland. It is a part of the Bismarck Archipelago. The Tabar group consists of a short chain of three main islands - Tabar Island (a.k.a. Big Tabar) in the south, Tatau Island in the center, and Simberi Island in the north - as well as a number of smaller offshore islets.

The population of the island group was 3,920 at the 2000 Census. The Tabar Group is administered by the Sentral Niu Ailan Rural Local Level Government (LLG).

The Tabar Group is the area of origin of Malagan art. The local language is Mandara (also known as Tabar), ISO 639-3 language code "tbf", an Austronesian language. Three dialects have been identified, Simberi, Tatau and Tabar.

References

External links
 

Islands of Papua New Guinea
New Ireland Province